Tom Strømstad Olsen (born 12 September 1971) is a Norwegian politician for the Labour Party.

He served as a deputy representative to the Norwegian Parliament from Vestfold during the term 2005–2009.

On the local level he is a member of Tønsberg municipal council.

References

1971 births
Living people
Deputy members of the Storting
Labour Party (Norway) politicians
Vestfold politicians
Politicians from Tønsberg
Place of birth missing (living people)
21st-century Norwegian politicians